Biltmore is an unincorporated community and census-designated place (CDP) in Carter County, Tennessee, United States. It was first listed as a CDP prior to the 2020 census.

It is in the northwest part of the county, with the city of Elizabethton, the county seat, bordering it to the south, across the Watauga River. Tennessee State Route 400 runs through the southern part of the community, leading south into Elizabethton and west  to Watauga. U.S. Route 19E runs along the northeast edge of Biltmore, leading north  to U.S. Route 19W at Bluff City and south through Elizabethton  to Elk Park, North Carolina.

Biltmore is drained by Lacy Hollow, Campbell Branch, and Stout Branch, which all flow south to the Watauga River. The Watauga flows west to the South Fork of the Holston River at Boone Lake, and is part of the Tennessee River watershed.

Demographics

References 

Census-designated places in Carter County, Tennessee
Census-designated places in Tennessee